Siah Kalan (also Romanized as Sīāh Kalān; also known as Sīāh Kolāhān) is a village in Kamalabad Rural District, in the Central District of Karaj County, Alborz Province, Iran. At the 2006 census, its population was 712, in 204 families.

References 

Populated places in Karaj County